The Zagreb tram network, run by the Zagrebački električni tramvaj (ZET), consists of 15 day and 4 night lines in Zagreb, Croatia. During the day every line runs on average every 5–10 minutes, but almost every station serves at least two routes. Nighttime lines have exact timetables averaging at about every 40 minutes. The first horsecar tram line was opened in 1891, and the first electric tram ran in 1910. Zagreb's tram system transported 204 million passengers in 2008.

History

At the end of the 19th century rapid urbanisation took place in Zagreb. City fathers started discussing the idea of installing horsecar system in Zagreb. The construction of one gauge tram track began on 11 May 1891. Trams should have been put in service on 15 August 1891, on the opening day of the Jubilee Economic-Forestry Exhibition. Due to vehicle delivery delay, however, the tram was instead put in service on 5 September 1891. That day was officially taken as the beginning of organised public transit system in Zagreb.

The first electric tram track was opened on 18 August 1910. The horse-drawn trams were kept until a tram electric network was finished, and then they were moved to Velika Gorica where they remained in use until 1937.

The oldest rolling units of the post-World War II tram system were the two-axle TMK 101 trams. Three prototype units were built by ZET workshops in early 1950s, and other 68 units until 1965 by Đuro Đaković factory, with 110 matching trailers. A few of them were replaced by GT6, but they were in regular use until the TMK 2200 series came. They started to be replaced in the 2000s (decade), as the TMK 2200 started going into operation, and by mid-2007, only about 15 units of type 101 were still operational, serving only as a substitute for other vehicles. They were eventually pulled out of service in late 2008.

Current lines

Daytime lines

Lines 10 and 16 no longer exist. Line 10 used to connect Savski most and Borongaj via the Central railway station. It was discontinued in the early 1980s, when a reorganisation of lines reintroduced line 1 and consequently made it impossible to have a line number 10; due to shift numbering, the lines 1 and 10 would end up overlapping. Line 16 used to connect Črnomerec and Zapruđe, but it was discontinued in 1991, due to a shortage of drivers when the Croatian war of independence started.

Line 15 is a specific exception: the line is closer to a light rail line than an actual tram line. It runs for approx. 3 km from Mihaljevac to Dolje. The line runs on a completely segregated right of way. A special type of catenary was developed for the line, which allows trams to reach speeds of 60 km/h. Thus, the line from Mihaljevac to Dolje is the fastest and the shortest line in the entire tram network. It was opened in the 1960s.

Night-time lines

Night-time lines are often substituted by buses due to track maintenance and repairs.

Track position 
Unusually for urban tram systems, Zagreb's tram tracks are generally positioned at the outer edge of the roadway, rather than in the middle of the street. In addition the tram lanes are often paved in concrete with small chequerboard grooves, rather than in tarmac. These factors make it difficult for cyclists, which leads many cyclists to cycle on the footways.

Rolling stock 
ZET rolling stock is very diverse. It currently includes around 240 motor units of 6 different tram types (as of 2019). On a normal work day there are over 190 units in use. Most of the stock today consists of TMK 2200, a total of 140 units acquired from 2005 to 2010. The next most common vehicle types are made by ČKD-Tatra, comprising a total of 95 units of T4YU with 85 matching B4YU trailers, and 51 units of the articulated KT4YU. T4YU vehicles entered service between 1977 and 1983, and KT4YU followed around 1985.

The oldest units still in service are TMK 201, built in 1973 and 1974 by Đuro Đaković. ZET used to have a total of 30 TMK-201 units with 32 trailers, of which nine remain in use, as some were scrapped and their bases were reused in the production of TMK 2100s.  TMK-201 are similarly designed, but technically significantly different from the older TMK 101, retired in 2008. ZET also has the only unit of an articulated ĐĐ prototype tram produced in 1990.

In 1994 Končar built the prototype of the articulated TMK 2100 tram, which was later produced from 1997 to 2003. A total of 16 units were built including the prototype, and some remain in service. Also, from 1994. to 1998. ZET bought 35 used Duewag GT6 trams (5 of them are GT6 "type Mannheim") from Mannheim, Germany, and started to retire old type 101 trams. They were brought as a temporary solution, as the lack of funds prevented the buying of new vehicles. All of the Düwag trams have since been replaced by TMK 2200 and scrapped.

In 2003 ZET ordered 70 new 100% low-floor trams from Crotram, a consortium led by Končar. 
In May 2005 the prototype was delivered. It has air-conditioning, cameras outside (instead of rear view mirrors) and inside; its maximum speed is limited to 50 km/h. This type is designated as TMK 2200 (Tramvajska Motorna Kola) by Crotram, although the designation NT 2200 (Niskopodni Tramvaj) is used by ZET. The last tram of the original order was delivered in May 2007, and on June 7 Zagreb organised a tram parade where all 70 TMK 2200 trams drove in a snake through the streets of Zagreb.

In July 2007. a contract for an additional 70 TMK 2200 vehicles was signed. On December 27, 2007, the 71st tram, the first from the second series was displayed. It has redesigned seat layout and wider passages.  On January 26, 2009, the 100th low floor tramcar entered service.  The last car from the second order entered service on June 30, 2010, meaning that currently there are 140 TMK 2200 trams operating in Zagreb. In 2012 City of Zagreb ordered 60 TMK 2200K, shorter version of TMK 2200 tram, all 60 were delivered by 2019. In 2022 City ordered additional 20 TMK 2200 Trams with further 40 trams to be ordered in following year (2023) for total of 260 TMK 2200 trams. New Trams will replace T4YU and last of the TMK 201 trams. City hopes to operate uniformed tram type by the end of decade, with TMK 2100 relegated to night service only. 

ZET also keeps two museum units of M-24 trams (built by ZET workshops), one with a "Košak" trailer (also built by ZET), and the other with "Pagoda" trailer, which was formerly 1910 motor car made by Ganz Budapest.

Gallery

See also
 Trams in Osijek

References

External links
 
 ZET – official webpage 
 Track plan of the Zagreb tram system

Transport in Zagreb
Zagreb
Railway companies established in 1891
Metre gauge railways in Croatia
Zagreb